Elton Alvin Veals (born March 26, 1961) is a former American football player who played running back for one season with the Pittsburgh Steelers of the National Football League (NFL).

Early life
Veals was born in Baton Rouge, Louisiana. He attended Istrouma High School. After graduation he enrolled at Merritt Community College. Following his two years there he was involved in a controversial recruiting saga that ended up getting the University of Illinois placed on probation. Veals eventually enrolled in Tulane University in 1982 and played football for the Tulane Green Wave.

Professional career
Veals was drafted by the Pittsburgh Steelers in the eleventh round of the 1984 NFL draft. He has played fifteen career NFL games.

References

1961 births
Living people
Players of American football from Baton Rouge, Louisiana
Pittsburgh Steelers players
Istrouma High School alumni